Events in the year 1944 in Spain.

Incumbents
Caudillo: Francisco Franco

Events 

 October: Invasion of Val d'Aran

Births
January 9 - José Gómez. (d. 2014)
 May 27 - Emilio Zapico. (d. 1996)
 November 11 - José Sancho. (d. 2013)
December 26 - Jesús Aranguren. (d. 2011)

Deaths
 February 18 – Alfredo Javaloyes López, musician (b. 1865)

See also
List of Spanish films of the 1940s

References

 
Years of the 20th century in Spain
1940s in Spain
Spain
Spain